Enemy at the Gates (Stalingrad in France and L'Ennemi aux portes in Canada) is a 2001 war film directed, co-written, and produced by Jean-Jacques Annaud, based on William Craig's 1973 nonfiction book Enemy at the Gates: The Battle for Stalingrad, which describes the events surrounding the Battle of Stalingrad in the winter of 1942–1943. The screenplay was written by Annaud and Alain Godard. The film's main character is a fictionalized version of Vasily Zaitsev, a sniper and Hero of the Soviet Union during World War II. It includes a snipers' duel between Zaitsev and a Wehrmacht sniper school director, Major Erwin König.

The cast includes Jude Law as Zaitsev, Rachel Weisz as Tania Chernova, and Ed Harris as König, with Joseph Fiennes, Bob Hoskins, Ron Perlman, Eva Mattes, Gabriel Marshall Thomson, and Matthias Habich in supporting roles.

Plot 
Vasily Zaitsev is a soldier in the Red Army and is sent to the front line of the Battle of Stalingrad in 1942. Forced into a suicidal charge without a rifle, he hides while a tank shell incapacitates a car. The occupant, Commissar Danilov, hides among numerous bodies, coincidentally next to Vasily, who uses his exceptional marksmanship to kill the German soldiers nearby.

Nikita Khrushchev demands ideas from his subordinates on morale. Danilov, now a senior lieutenant, suggests that the people need "an example to follow" and recommends Zaitsev for the job. Soon after, Danilov begins publishing heroic tales of Vasily's exploits in the army's newspaper. Vasily is transferred to the sniper division and becomes friends with Danilov. Both also become romantically interested in Tania Chernova, a private in the local militia. In fear for her safety, Danilov has her transferred away to an intelligence unit, ostensibly to make use of her German skills in translating radio intercepts.

With the Soviet snipers taking an increasing toll on the German forces, German Major Erwin König is deployed to kill Vasily and crush Soviet morale. When the Red Army command learns of König's mission, they dispatch König's former student Koulikov to help Vasily kill him. König, however, outmaneuvers Koulikov and kills him, shaking Vasily's spirits. Khrushchev pressures Danilov to bring the sniper standoff to a conclusion. Sasha, a young Soviet boy, volunteers to act as a double agent by passing König false information about Vasily's whereabouts. Vasily sets a trap for König and manages to wound him with help of Tania, who has come to rescue Vasily. During a second attempt, Vasily falls asleep, and his sniper log is stolen by a looting German soldier. The German command takes the log as evidence of Vasily's death and plans to send König home, but König does not believe that Vasily is dead.

The German general takes König's dog tags to prevent Soviet propaganda from profiting if König is killed. König gives the general a War Merit Cross that was posthumously awarded to König's son, who was a lieutenant in the 116th Infantry Division and killed in the early days of the battle. König tells Sasha where he will be next, suspecting that the boy will tell Vasily. Tania and Vasily have meanwhile fallen in love. That night, Tania secretly goes to the Soviet barracks and makes love with Vasily. The jealous Danilov disparages Vasily in a letter to his superiors.

König spots Tania and Vasily waiting for him at his next ambush spot, confirming his suspicions about Sasha. He then kills the boy and hangs his body to bait Vasily. Vasily vows to kill König and sends Tania and Danilov to evacuate Sasha's mother. Tania is wounded by shrapnel en route to the boats. Thinking she is dead, Danilov regrets his jealousy of Vasily and expresses disenchantment over his previous ardour for communism. Finding Vasily waiting to ambush König, Danilov intentionally exposes himself in order to provoke König into shooting him and revealing his position, sacrificing his life. Thinking that he has killed Vasily, König goes to inspect the body and is then in Vasily's sights. Accepting his fate, König turns to face Vasily, who shoots him squarely in the eye and takes his rifle. Two months later, after Stalingrad has been liberated and German forces have surrendered, Vasily finds Tania recovering in a field hospital.

Cast 

 Jude Law as Vasily Zaitsev
 Alexander Schwan as young Vasily
 Joseph Fiennes as Commissar Danilov
 Rachel Weisz as Tania Chernova
 Bob Hoskins as Nikita Khrushchev
 Ed Harris as Major Erwin König
 Ron Perlman as Koulikov
 Eva Mattes as Mother Filippova
 Gabriel Marshall-Thomson as Sasha Filippov
 Matthias Habich as General Friedrich Paulus
 Sophie Rois as Ludmilla
 Ivan Shvedoff as Volodya
 Mario Bandi as Anton
 Gennadi Vengerov as Starshina
 Mikhail Matveyev as Grandfather
 Clemens Schick as Voigt
 Hans Martin Stier as General Prudius
 Gennadi Vengerov as Kushnir
 Robert Stadlober as Spotter
 Holger Handtke as Baumann
 Werner Daehn as Anosov
 Birol Ünel as Kuklin
 Valentin Platareanu as General Arthur Schmidt
 Tom Wlaschiha as Soldier
 Lenn Kudrjawizki as Comrade in Train

Production 
The filming of Enemy of the Gates took place in Germany. The crossing of the Volga River was shot on the Altdöberner See, a man-made lake near the village of Pritzen, in the south of Brandenburg. A derelict factory in the village of Rüdersdorf was used to recreate the ruins of Stalingrad's tractor factory. The massive outdoor set of Stalingrad's Red Square was built at Krampnitz, near Potsdam. It was a former Wehrmacht riding school that had served as a Soviet barracks during the Cold War. Set construction began in October 1999 and took almost five months to complete. The scene at the end with the waving coats is a reference to Sergio Leone.

Soundtrack 
The soundtrack to Enemy at the Gates was written by James Horner and released on 31 March 2001.

Reception 
On Rotten Tomatoes, the film has a 53% approval rating from 139 critics with a weighted average score of 5.70/10. The website's consensus says: "Atmospheric and thrilling, Enemy at the Gates gets the look and feel of war right. However, the love story seems out of place." Metacritic, which assigns a normalized rating, calculated an average score of 53 out of 100, based on 33 reviews.

Military historian David R. Stone praised the cast and said the film is "a good thing for the study of the Eastern Front during World War II" but criticized its historical inaccuracies and presentation, concluding: "To end on a brighter note, Enemy at the Gates has at the very least boosted the number of my students who drop by the office to ask questions about Stalingrad. I only wish it had done a better job of giving them good answers." For the Society for Military History, historian Roger Reese wrote: "As a work of fictionalized history this movie serves a useful purpose beyond entertainment, that of bringing to the attention of movie-goers in the West the sacrifices Soviet soldiers made in defending their country and defeating Hitler and giving a face to those legions still largely anonymous to us."

Roger Ebert of the Chicago Sun-Times gave the film three stars out of four and wrote that it "is about two men placed in a situation where they have to try to use their intelligence and skills to kill each other. When Annaud focuses on that, the movie works with rare concentration. The additional plot stuff and the romance are kind of a shame." New Yorks Peter Ranier was less kind, declaring: "It's as if an obsessed film nut had decided to collect every bad war-film convention on one computer and program it to spit out a script." Peter Travers of Rolling Stone admitted the film had faults but said that "any flaws in execution pale against those moments when the film brings history to vital life." 

The film received unenthusiastic reviews in Russia but had good box office in Moscow and Saint Petersburg. Some Red Army Stalingrad veterans were so offended by inaccuracies in the film and how the Red Army was portrayed that on 7 May 2001, shortly after the film premiered in Russia, they expressed their displeasure in the State Duma, demanding a ban of the film but their request was not granted. The film was also received poorly in Germany. Critics stated that it simplified history and glorified war. At the Berlinale film festival, it was booed. Annaud stated afterwards that he would not present another film at Berlinale, calling it a "slaughterhouse" and said that his film received much better reception elsewhere.

Historical accuracy 

As a film inspired by real events, it was dramatized and the plot was fictional in several ways. It contained several inaccuracies, including about Vasily Zaitsev, developments of the war, graphic details, and maps depicting a modern map of Russia, Ukraine, and the Baltic states as independent countries, as well as Turkey being invaded by Nazi Germany. Zaitsev was a senior sergeant in the 2nd Battalion, 1047th Rifle Regiment, 284th Tomsk Rifle Division, during the Battle of Stalingrad. The film uses events from William Craig's 1973 nonfiction book Enemy at the Gates: The Battle for Stalingrad but is not a direct adaptation. Historian Antony Beevor said he believed Zaitsev's story to be fictional. There is no documentation about the duel between Zaytsev and Major Erwin König.

The film overdramatizes the role of blocking detachments in the Red Army. Although there was Order No. 227 that became the rallying cry of "Not a step back!", machine gunners were not placed behind regular troops with orders to kill anyone who retreated, and they were used only for penal troops. As per Order No. 227, each detachment would have between three and five barrier squads per 200 personnel.  At the same time, the film understates the role of women. In the film, two women snipers appear but never shoot at anyone, but in fact, Soviet women snipers have been credited with killing over 10,000 enemies in combat.

The film's first scene shows new Soviet troops, including Zaitsev, arriving at the Stalingrad front, being screamed at, threatened, and in general humiliated by their commanders. They are then transported and locked in crowded boxcars to stop them from deserting. According to military historian Boris Yulin, that was forbidden and is unrealistic, as the soldiers would have then been killed in case of a German air raid or shelling. According to historian Alexey Isaev, who has written several books about the Battle of Stalingrad, blocking detachments were mostly used in Stalingrad as "usual combat regiments" although the film emphasizes the message that "most Soviet soldiers needed a literal gun in the back in order to go into battle". As there were many cases of heroism, it is argued it was unlikely that Soviet soldiers were motivated only by fear. In regards to lack of weapons, which happened early in the war and changed by 1942, Isaev said: "There were no unarmed soldiers sent to the attack.... What is shown in Enemy at the Gates is pure nonsense."

See also 
 American Sniper

References

External links 

 
 
 
 
 
 

2000s American films
2000s British films
2000s French films
2000s German films
2000s war drama films
2001 drama films
2001 films
American war drama films
American World War II films
British World War II films
Cultural depictions of Nikita Khrushchev
Eastern Front of World War II films
English-language French films
English-language German films
English-language Irish films
Films about Nazis
Films about snipers
Films about the Battle of Stalingrad
Films based on non-fiction books
Films directed by Jean-Jacques Annaud
Films scored by James Horner
French World War II films
German World War II films
Irish drama films
Mandalay Pictures films
Paramount Pictures films
Siege films
Sniper warfare
War epic films
War romance films
World War II films based on actual events
Irish war films